Le Moulin is the highest point in Sark and is also the highest point of the Bailiwick of Guernsey, a British Crown Dependency in the English Channel off the coast of Normandy, with an altitude of 114 metres (374 ft).

See also
 Geography of Guernsey
 Le Moulin de Mougins (in France)

External links
  Guernsey, Answers.com.

Le Moulin
Sark